Qofas (also Romanized as Qofās and Qafās; also known as Absin, Gafāş, Gofās, Hāji Sālih, and Ḩājjī Şāleḩ) is a village in Bahmanshir-e Jonubi Rural District, in the Central District of Abadan County, Khuzestan Province, Iran. At the 2006 census, its population was 34, in 8 families.

References 

Populated places in Abadan County